Route nationale 60 (or RN 60) is a Route nationale in France, connecting the commune of Orléans to that of Troyes.  Before alterations in 1972, it joined Châteauneuf-sur-Loire to Toul via Troyes.  A decree of December 5, 2005 has set out the declassification of the route.  A high-speed roadway was constructed from Orléans to Châteauneuf-sur-Loire.  The old route, previously a part of Route nationale 152, was declassified to RD 960.  The route was declassified from RN 60 to RD 60 in Haute-Marne, and to RD 960 in Meuse, Meurthe-et-Moselle, and in Aube to the east of Troyes.  In 2006, the road was declassified to D 660 in Aube to the west of Troyes and in Yonne, and to D 2060 in Loiret.

From Orléans to Montargis (D 2060)

 Orléans 
 Saint-Jean-de-Braye 
 Combleux 
 Chécy 
 Mardié 
 Saint-Denis-de-l'Hôtel 
 Châteauneuf-sur-Loire 
 Le Pont-des-Besniers, commune de Sury-aux-Bois 
 Bellegarde 
 Ladon 
 Saint-Maurice-sur-Fessard 
 Villemandeur 
 Le Tourneau, commune de Pannes 
 Montargis

From Montargis to Sens (D 2060, D 660)

 Montargis 
 Amilly 
 La Chapelle-Saint-Sépulcre 
 La Maltournée, commune de Saint-Hilaire-les-Andrésis 
 Courtenay 
 Les Dornets, commune de Savigny-sur-Clairis 
 Subligny 
 Paron 
 Sens

From  Sens to Vulaines (D 660)

 Sens 
 Malay-le-Petit 
 Le Petit-Villiers, commune de Villiers-Louis 
 Pont-sur-Vanne 
 La Grenouillère, commune de Chigy 
 Foissy-sur-Vanne 
 Molinons 
 Villeneuve-l'Archevêque 
 Bagneaux 
 Vulaines

From Vulaines to Troyes (D 660)

 Vulaines 
 Saint-Benoist-sur-Vanne 
 Cosdon 
 Villemaur-sur-Vanne 
 Estissac 
 Fontvannes 
 La Grange-au-Rez, commune de Montgueux 
 La Rivière-de-Corps 
 Sainte-Savine
 Troyes

From Troyes to Soulaines-Dhuys (D 960)

 Troyes
 Pont-Sainte-Marie
 Creney-près-Troyes
 La Belle-Épine, commune de Mesnil-Sellières
 Piney
 Lesmont
 Les Fontaines, commune de Précy-Saint-Martin
 Brienne-le-Château
 Chaumesnil
 Soulaines-Dhuys

From Soulaines-Dhuys to Saudron (D 60)

 Soulaines-Dhuys
 Nully-Trémilly
 Blumeray
 Doulevant-le-Château
 Dommartin-le-Saint-Père
 Courcelles-sur-Blaise
 Dommartin-le-Franc
 Morancourt
 Nomécourt
 Joinville
 Thonnance-lès-Joinville
 Montreuil-sur-Thonnance
 Saudron

From Saudron to Toul (D 960)

 Saudron
 Bonnet
 Houdelaincourt
 Delouze-Rosières
 Montigny-lès-Vaucouleurs
 Vaucouleurs
 Chalaines
 Saint-Martin
 Blénod-lès-Toul
 Toul

060